Bánovce nad Bebravou District is a district in the Trenčín Region of western Slovakia. Until 1918, the district was mostly part of the 
county of Kingdom of Hungary of Trencsén, except for a small area in the south which formed part of the county of Nyitra.

Municipalities

References

External links
 Official site
 Photography from Banovce nad Bebravou

Districts of Slovakia
Trenčín Region